Malcolm Darroch (2 September 1938 – 12 February 1985) was a Scottish amateur football inside forward who played in the Scottish League for Queen's Park. He was capped by Scotland at amateur level.

References

Scottish footballers
Scottish Football League players
Queen's Park F.C. players
Association football inside forwards
Scotland amateur international footballers
1985 deaths
1938 births
Footballers from Glasgow
St Mirren F.C. players